Romanovka is a rural locality (a selo) in Novonikolayevsky Selsoviet, Rubtsovsky District, Altai Krai, Russia. The population was 378 as of 2013. There are 4 streets.

Geography 
Romanovka is located 33 km southeast of Rubtsovsk (the district's administrative centre) by road. Vishnyovka is the nearest rural locality.

References 

Rural localities in Rubtsovsky District